The 12th constituency of the Pas-de-Calais is a French legislative constituency in the Pas-de-Calais département.

Description

Pas-de-Calais' 12th constituency lies in the centre of the department around the mining city of Liévin.

Until 2017, the seat was strongly left leaning resulting in unbroken Socialist Party control from 1988.

Historic Representation

Election results

2022

 
 
 
 
 
 
|-
| colspan="8" bgcolor="#E9E9E9"|
|-

2017

2012

2007

 
 
 
 
 
 
 
 
|-
| colspan="8" bgcolor="#E9E9E9"|
|-

2002

 
 
 
 
 
 
 
|-
| colspan="8" bgcolor="#E9E9E9"|
|-

1997

 
 
 
 
 
 
 
|-
| colspan="8" bgcolor="#E9E9E9"|
|-
 
 

 
 
 
 

* Withdrew before the 2nd round

Sources
 Official results of French elections from 1998: 

12